Serpent Sermon is the twelfth studio album by Swedish black metal band Marduk. It was released in North America on 5 June 2012 through Century Media Records on CD, vinyl and digital download. It reached number 44 on the Top Heatseekers Albums chart, selling roughly 800 copies in its first week. Limited edition versions of the album include the bonus track "Coram Satanae", and a limited edition 7" vinyl EP of "Souls for Belial" was also released, featuring a cover of Wovenhand's "Oil On Panel". A music video of "Souls for Belial" was also released on 9 May 2012. The last album to feature drummer Lars Broddesson.

Track listing

All music and lyrics written by Marduk.

Personnel
Marduk
 Mortuus – vocals
 Morgan Steinmeyer Håkansson – guitar
 Magnus "Devo" Andersson – bass
 Lars Broddesson – drums

Charts

References

2012 albums
Marduk (band) albums
Century Media Records albums